Alexandre Alves da Silva (born 6 March 1981) is a Brazilian former professional footballer who played as a midfielder.

He joined FC KAMAZ Naberezhnye Chelny in March 2004, and joined Saturn later in the same year.

External links
 
  Brazilian FA Database
  Alex Alves signing for CP Villarrobledo
  Profile at CP Villarrobledo

1981 births
Sportspeople from Paraná (state)
Living people
Brazilian footballers
Association football midfielders
Russian Premier League players
Segunda División players
Segunda División B players
Guarani FC players
Santos FC players
FC KAMAZ Naberezhnye Chelny players
FC Saturn Ramenskoye players
Pontevedra CF footballers
Lorca Deportiva CF footballers
CP Villarrobledo players
Lorca Atlético CF players
Brazilian expatriate footballers
Brazilian expatriate sportspeople in Russia
Expatriate footballers in Russia
Brazilian expatriate sportspeople in Spain
Expatriate footballers in Spain